Amy Recha Pristifana bin Samion (born 13 April 1992) is a Singaporean footballer who plays as a forward for Singapore Premier League side Hougang United and the Singapore National Team.

Early life
Amy was born in Surabaya, Indonesia, His father and mother is Indonesian, when he was little, he lived for a few years in Surabaya and Batam, before finally moving to Singapore.

Club career

Geylang International
Amy made his debut for Geylang International in the S.League on 25 May 2011 against Balestier Khalsa, coming on as a 59th-minute substitute for Masrezwan Masturi in the 59th minute, in which he also scored his first goal of his career in the 72nd minute as Geylang lost the match 3–1. He then scored his second goal of his career almost a year later on 10 May 2012 against Warriors in which he found the net in the 78th minute as Geylang drew the match 2–2.

Young Lions
Amywas loaned to the Young Lions FC between 2014 and 2015 and returned to the club in 2016.

Home United
Amy signed for Home United in 2018 after a dismal 2017 with Geylang International.

Geylang International
In 2019, Amy returned to the Eagles' nest after 1 season with the Protector.

Hougang United 
On 19 January 2022, Amy signed for the Singapore Premier League side Hougang United.

International career 
He was named in the Japan tour in 2016 but failed to earn official cap.

On 27 August 2021, Amy has been call-up for September National Team training camp under Japanese Tatsuma Yoshida after his fine form in the league this season.

On 11 November 2021, Amy made his international debut for the Singapore National Team in an International 'A' Friendly match against Kyrgyzstan.

In 2022, Amy was included in the national team for the 2022 FAS Tri-Nations Series and 2022 AFF Championship.

Career statistics

Club
Statistics accurate as of 10 October 2021

International

International caps

References

External links 
 

1992 births
Living people
Singaporean people of Javanese descent
Singaporean people of Indonesian descent
Singaporean footballers
Singapore Premier League players
Association football forwards
Geylang International FC players
Young Lions FC players